Raimundo Franisse is a Mozambican butterfly swimmer. He competed in two events at the 1980 Summer Olympics.

References

External links
 

Year of birth missing (living people)
Living people
Mozambican male butterfly swimmers
Olympic swimmers of Mozambique
Swimmers at the 1980 Summer Olympics
Place of birth missing (living people)